Patchen may refer to:

People
Patchen Markell (born 1969), academic in political science
Kenneth Patchen (1911–1972), American poet and novelist
Miriam Patchen (1914–2000), wife and muse of Kenneth Patchen
David Patchen (fl. 2001–2016), American glass artist

Other uses
Joe Patchen (1889–1917), Standardbred racehorse
Patchen, California, a ghost town in the Santa Cruz Mountains, California
Patchen Pass, a mountain pass in the Santa Cruz Mountains of California

See also
Panchen, in Tibetan Buddhism